"She Ain't Worth It" is a song by recording artist Glenn Medeiros. It features a rap from R&B artist Bobby Brown. The song reached  1 for two weeks on the US Billboard Hot 100, becoming Medeiros' only No. 1 hit in the United States, and the second and last No. 1 hit where Brown has received credit as an artist, after "My Prerogative". The single also reached the top 20 on the UK Singles Chart, where Medeiros had previously reached number one with "Nothing's Gonna Change My Love for You", and peaked within the top 10 in Australia, Canada, Finland, and Ireland.

Charts

Weekly charts

Year-end charts

All-time charts

Certifications

References

1990 singles
1990 songs
Billboard Hot 100 number-one singles
Bobby Brown songs
Cashbox number-one singles
Glenn Medeiros songs
MCA Records singles
Songs written by Antonina Armato
Songs written by Bobby Brown